The following is a discography of production by the Neptunes, a production duo consisting of Pharrell Williams and Chad Hugo.

Singles produced

1996–2003
{| class="wikitable plainrowheaders" style="text-align:center;" border="1"
|+ List of singles, with selected chart positions, showing year released and album name
! scope="col" rowspan="2" style="width:16em;"| Title
! scope="col" rowspan="2"| Year
! scope="col" colspan="10"| Peak chart positions
! scope="col" rowspan="2" style="width:10em;"| Certifications
! scope="col" rowspan="2"| Album
|-
! scope="col" style="width:3em;font-size:90%;"| US
! scope="col" style="width:3em;font-size:90%;"| US R&B
! scope="col" style="width:3em;font-size:90%;"| AUS
! scope="col" style="width:3em;font-size:90%;"| CAN
! scope="col" style="width:3em;font-size:90%;"| FRA
! scope="col" style="width:3em;font-size:90%;"| GER
! scope="col" style="width:3em;font-size:90%;"| IRE
! scope="col" style="width:3em;font-size:90%;"| NL
! scope="col" style="width:3em;font-size:90%;"| SWI
! scope="col" style="width:3em;font-size:90%;"| UK
|-
! scope="row"| "Use Your Heart"(SWV)
|rowspan="2" |1996
|22
|6
|—
|—
|—
|—
|—
|—
|—
|—
|
|New Beginning
|-
! scope="row"| "When Boy Meets Girl"(Total)
|50
|28
|—
|—
|—
|—
|—
|—
|—
|—
|
|Total
|-
! scope="row"| "I Can't Make a Mistake"(MC Lyte)
| rowspan="4" |1998
|—
|—
|—
|—
|—
|—
|—
|—
|—
|46
|
| rowspan="2" |Seven & Seven
|-
! scope="row"| "It's All Yours"(MC Lyte featuring Gina Thompson)
|—
|—
|—
|—
|—
|—
|—
|—
|—
|36
|
|-
! scope="row"| "Lookin' at Me"(Mase featuring Puff Daddy)
|8
|8
|—
|17
|—
|—
|—
|—
|—
|—
|
 RIAA: Gold
|Harlem World
|-
! scope="row"| "Superthug"(N.O.R.E.)
|36
|15
|—
|—
|—
|—
|—
|—
|—
|—
|
|N.O.R.E.
|-
! scope="row"| "The Funeral"(Clipse)
| rowspan="5" |1999
|—
|—
|—
|—
|—
|—
|—
|—
|—
|—
|
|Exclusive Audio Footage
|-
! scope="row"| "Got Your Money"(Ol' Dirty Bastard featuring Kelis)
|26
|19
|—
|—
|82
|—
|—
|96
|—
|11
|
 BPI: Silver
|Nigga Please
|-
! scope="row"| "Oh No"(N.O.R.E.)
|—
|49
|—
|—
|—
|—
|—
|—
|—
|113
|
|Melvin Flynt - Da Hustler
|-
! scope="row"| "Caught Out There"(Kelis)
|54
|9
|26
|10
|96
|40
|23
|3
|35
|4
|
| rowspan="3" |Kaleidoscope
|-
! scope="row"| "Good Stuff"(Kelis)
|—
|—
|—
|—
|—
|72
|49
|78
|74
|19
|
|-
! scope="row"| "Get Along with You"(Kelis)
| rowspan="7" |2000
|—
|57
|—
|—
|—
|—
|—
|93
|—
|51
|
|-
! scope="row"| "Shake Ya Ass"(Mystikal)
|13
|3
|62
|—
|—
|87
|—
|66
|—
|30
|
|Let's Get Ready
|-
! scope="row"| "Girls Dem Sugar"(Beenie Man featuring Mýa)
|54
|16
|—
|—
|—
|—
|—
|—
|—
|13
|
|Art & Life
|-
! scope="row"| "Cross the Border"(Philly's Most Wanted)
|98
|50
|—
|—
|—
|—
|—
|—
|—
|—
|
|Get Down or Lay Down
|-
! scope="row"| "I Just Wanna Love U (Give It 2 Me)"(Jay-Z)
|11
|1
|—
|—
|—
|75
|—
|61
|86
|7
|
|The Dynasty: Roc La Familia
|-
! scope="row"| "Danger (Been So Long)"(Mystikal featuring Nivea)
|14
|1
|—
|—
|—
|45
|—
|36
|60
|28
|
|Let's Get Ready
|-
! scope="row"| "Southern Hospitality"(Ludacris)
|23
|6
|—
|—
|—
|—
|—
|—
|—
|—
|
|Back for the First Time
|-
! scope="row"| "Dem Thangs"(Angie Martinez)
| rowspan="15" |2001
|—
|80
|—
|—
|—
|—
|—
|—
|—
|—
|
|Up Close and Personal
|-
! scope="row"| "Lapdance"(N.E.R.D. featuring Vita and Lee Harvey)
|—
|85
|—
|—
|—
|—
|—
|56
|—
|20
|
|In Search Of...
|-
! scope="row"| "Wait a Minute"(Ray J featuring Lil' Kim and Pharrell)
|30
|8
|—
|—
|—
|72
|
|75
|80
|54
|
|This Ain't a Game
|-
! scope="row"| "I'm Serious"(T.I. featuring Beenie Man)
|—
|—
|—
|—
|—
|—
|—
|—
|—
|—
|
|I'm Serious
|-
! scope="row"| "There She Goes"(Babyface)
|31
|10
|—
|—
|—
|—
|—
|—
|—
|—
|
|Face2Face
|-
! scope="row"| "Please Don't Mind"(Philly's Most Wanted)
|—
|48
|—
|—
|—
|—
|—
|—
|—
|—
|
|Get Down or Lay Down
|-
! scope="row"| "Candy"(Foxy Brown featuring Kelis)
| —
|48
|—
|—
|—
|—
|—
|—
|—
|—
|
|Broken Silence
|-
! scope="row"| "I'm a Slave 4 U"(Britney Spears)
|27
|85
|7
|8
|8
|3
|6
|9
|7
|4
|
 ARIA: Gold
 SNEP: Silver
 BPI: Silver
|Britney
|-
! scope="row"| "Young, Fresh n' New"(Kelis)
|—
|—
|—
|—
|—
|—
|—
|89
|—
|32
|
|Wanderland
|-
! scope="row"| "Knock Yourself Out"(Jadakiss)
|114
|34
|—
|—
|—
|—
|—
|—
|—
|—
|
|Kiss Tha Game Goodbye
|-
! scope="row"| "Diddy"(P. Diddy featuring the Neptunes)
|66
|21
|31
|—
|—
|59
|—
|—
|84
|19
|
|The Saga Continues...
|-
! scope="row"| "Bouncin' Back (Bumpin' Me Against the Wall)"(Mystikal)
|37
|8
|—
|—
|—
|—
|—
|—
|—
|45
|
|Tarantula
|-
! scope="row"| "As I Come Back"(Busta Rhymes)
|—
|91
|—
|—
|—
|—
|—
|—
|—
|—
|
|Genesis
|-
! scope="row"| "Run Away (I Wanna Be with U)"(Nivea featuring Pusha T)
|—
|—
|47
|—
|—
|—
|—
|—
|—
|48
|
|Nivea
|-
! scope="row"| "Young'n (Holla Back)"(Fabolous)
|33
|17
|—
|—
|—
|—
|—
|—
|—
|—
|
|Ghetto Fabolous
|-
! scope="row"| "U Don't Have to Call"(Usher)
| rowspan="21" |2002
|3
|2
|56
|—
|72
|—
|—
|—
|27
|6
|
|8701
|-
! scope="row"| "I Still Love You"(702)
|—
|49
|—
|—
|—
|—
|—
|—
|—
|—
|
|Star
|-
! scope="row"| "Formal Invite"(Ray J featuring Pharrell)
|—
|54
|—
|—
|—
|—
|—
|95
|—
|20
|
|This Ain't a Game
|-
! scope="row"| "Pass the Courvoisier, Part II"(Busta Rhymes featuring P. Diddy and Pharrell)
|11
|4
|—
|—
|—
|—
|—
|—
|—
|16
|
|Genesis
|-
! scope="row"| "Girlfriend"(NSYNC featuring Nelly)
|5
|23
|2
|1
|—
|6
|8
|8
|23
|2
|
 ARIA: Gold
 BPI: Silver
|Celebrity
|-
! scope="row"| "Take Ya Home"(Lil Bow Wow)
|72
|21
|—
|—
|—
|—
|—
|—
|—
|—
|
|Doggy Bag
|-
! scope="row"| "Hot in Herre"(Nelly)
|1
|1
|3
|1
|23
|8
|10
|4
|10
|4
|
 RIAA: 2× Platinum
 ARIA: Platinum
 BVMI: Gold
 BPI: Platinum
|Nellyville
|-
! scope="row"| "Grindin'"(Clipse)
|30
|10
|—
|—
|—
|—
|—
|—
|—
|—
|
|Lord Willin'
|-
! scope="row"| "Nothin'"(N.O.R.E. featuring Pharrell)
|10
|2
|—
|—
|—
|—
|—
|—
|—
|11
|
|God's Favorite
|-
! scope="row"| "Work It Out"(Beyoncé)
|—
|—
|21
|—
|87
|75
|12
|26
|48
|7
|
 ARIA: Gold
|Austin Powers in Goldmember: Music from the Motion Picture
|-
! scope="row"| "Feel It Boy"(Beenie Man featuring Janet Jackson)
|28
|31
|18
|15
|—
|72
|—
|—
|—
|9
|
 ARIA: Gold
|Tropical Storm
|-
! scope="row"| "Boys"(Britney Spears)
| —
|—
|14
|21
|55
|19
|10
|13
|20
|7
|
 ARIA: Gold
|Britney
|-
! scope="row"| "Rock Star"(N.E.R.D.)
|—
|—
|32
|—
|—
|—
|—
|74
|—
|15
|
|In Search Of...
|-
! scope="row"| "When the Last Time"(Clipse featuring Kelis and Pharrell)
|19
|8
|—
|—
|—
|—
|—
|—
|—
|41
|
|Lord Willin|-
! scope="row"| "Luv U Better"(LL Cool J featuring Marc Dorsey)
|4
|1
|—
|—
|—
|—
|—
|—
|42
|7
|
|10
|-
! scope="row"| "Like I Love You"(Justin Timberlake)
|11
|53
|8
|11
|—
|16
|5
|5
|14
|2
|
 ARIA: Platinum
 BPI: Gold
|Justified
|-
! scope="row"| "From tha Chuuuch to da Palace"(Snoop Dogg featuring Pharrell)
|77
|23
|—
|—
|—
|75
|—
|97
|—
|27
|
|Paid tha Cost to Be da Boss
|-
! scope="row"| "Hit the Freeway"(Toni Braxton featuring Loon)
|86
|32
|46
|31
|—
|56
|40
|—
|38
|29
|
|More Than A Woman
|-
! scope="row"| "Come Close"(Common featuring Mary J. Blige)
|65
|21
|—
|—
|—
|—
|—
|—
|—
|—
|
|Electric Circus
|-
! scope="row"| "Ma, I Don't Love Her"(Clipse featuring Faith Evans)
|86
|40
|—
|—
|—
|—
|—
|—
|—
|38
|
|Lord Willin'''
|-
! scope="row"| "Star"(702 featuring Clipse)
|—
|98
|—
|—
|—
|—
|—
|—
|—
|—
|
|Star|-
! scope="row"| "Beautiful"(Snoop Dogg featuring Pharrell and Uncle Charlie Wilson)
| rowspan="13" |2003
|6
|3
|4
|—
|39
|27
|1
|13
|19
|23
|
 ARIA: Gold
 BPI: Silver
|Paid tha Cost to Be da Boss|-
! scope="row"| "Excuse Me Miss"(Jay-Z)
|8
|1
|38
|8
|—
|—
|—
|—
|—
|17
|
 RIAA: Gold
|The Blueprint 2: The Gift & The Curse|-
! scope="row"| "What Happened to That Boy"(Baby featuring Clipse)
|45
|14
|—
|—
|—
|—
|—
|—
|—
|—
|
|Birdman|-
! scope="row"| "Belly Dancer"(Kardinal Offishall featuring Pharrell)
|—
|96
|—
|—
|—
|—
|—
|—
|—
|—
|
|
|-
! scope="row"| "Rock Your Body"(Justin Timberlake)
|5
|45
|1
|
|15
|25
|4
|6
|34
|2
|
 RIAA: Gold
 ARIA: 2× Platinum
 BPI: Platinum
|Justified|-
! scope="row"| "Amazin'"(LL Cool J featuring Kandice Love)
|—
|73
|—
|—
|—
|—
|—
|—
|—
|—
|
|10|-
! scope="row"| "Hot Damn"(Clipse featuring Ab-Liva, Pharrell, and Roscoe P. Coldchain)
|—
|58
|—
|—
|—
|—
|—
|—
|—
|—
|
|Lord Willin and Clones|-
! scope="row"| "Frontin'"(Pharrell Williams featuring Jay-Z)
|5
|1
|28
|15
|—
|61
|16
|21
|23
|6
|
|Clones|-
! scope="row"| "Señorita"(Justin Timberlake)
|27
|—
|6
|19
|41
|51
|15
|26
|42
|13
|
 ARIA: Platinum
 BPI: Silver
|Justified|-
! scope="row"| "Light Your Ass on Fire"(Busta Rhymes)
|58
|23
|—
|—
|—
|—
|—
|—
|—
|—
|
|Clones|-
! scope="row"| "Milkshake"(Kelis)
|3
|4
|2
|—
|52
|22
|1
|7
|22
|2
|
 RIAA: Gold
 ARIA: Platinum
 BPI: Gold
|Tasty|-
! scope="row"| "Change Clothes"(Jay-Z featuring Pharrell)
|10
|6
|46
|—
|—
|54
|—
|40
|3
|32
|
|The Black Album|-
! scope="row"| "Show Me Your Soul"(Lenny Kravitz, P. Diddy, Loon, and Pharrell)
|—
|—
|45
|—
|—
|61
|—
|—
|62
|35
|
|Bad Boys 2 OST|-
|colspan="14" style="font-size:90%"| "—" denotes a recording that did not chart or was not released in that territory.
|}

2004–present

 Albums produced 

 1996 
Total – Total 14. "When Boy Meets Girl" (produced with Sean "Puffy" Combs)

SWV – The New Beginning 6. "Use Your Heart"
 10. "Use Your Heart (Interlude)"
 13. "When This Feeling"

 1997 
Keystone – A Tear Falls In Brooklyn 11. If It Ain't Love (The Neptunes Remix)
 15. The Day the Earth Stood Still

Mase – Harlem World 06. "Lookin' At Me" featuring Puff Daddy

 1998 
Noreaga – N.O.R.E. 13. "Superthug"

MC Lyte – Seven & Seven 10. "It's All Yours" (featuring Gina Thompson)
 11. "I Can't Make A Mistake" 
 16. "Closer" (featuring Space Nine)

Brand Nubian – Take It To The Head (CDS) "Take It To The Head" (Don't Let It Go To Your Head Remix) 

 1999 
Clipse – Exclusive Audio Footage All tracks

Pras – What'cha Wanna Do (CDS) Whatcha Wanna Do (The Neptunes Bang Your Head Remix) (feat. Pharrell, Kelis and Clipse)

Harlem World – Tha Movement 10. One Big Fiesta (featuring Mase)
 13. Not the Kids (featuring Rashad)

Noreaga – Melvin Flynt - Da Hustler 5. "Cocaine Business (Hysteria)" (featuring Kelis)
 16. "Oh No"

Ol' Dirty Bastard – Nigga Please 1. "Recognize" (featuring Chris Rock)
 3. "Cold Blooded" 
 4. "Got Your Money" (featuring Kelis)

Prince – The Greatest Romance Ever Sold (CDM) "The Greatest Romance Ever Sold" (Neptunes Extended Edit, featuring Q-Tip)

Kelis – Kaleidoscope All tracks

 2000 
Ben Harper and the Innocent Criminals – Steal My Kisses (CDS) 4. "Steal My Kisses (The Neptunes Beatbox Mix)"

504 Boyz – The Goodfellas 18. "D-Game" (featuring Pharrell and Pusha T)

Half-A-Mill – Milion 10. "Thug Onez" (featuring Noreaga, Kool G Rap & Musalini)

Beenie Man – Art & Life 2. "Ola" (featuring Steve Perry)
 4. "Girls Dem Sugar" (featuring Mýa)
 7. "Jamaica Way" (featuring Kelis)

Mystikal – Let's Get Ready 2. "Shake Ya Ass" (featuring Pharrell) 
 3. Jump
 4. "Danger (Been So Long)" (featuring Nivea) 
 10. "Family" (featuring Latrelle)

Shyne – Shyne 9. "Niggas Gonna Die"

Guru – Jazzmatazz Vol. 3: Streetsoul 4. "All I Said" (featuring Macy Gray)
 10. "Supa Luv" (featuring Kelis)

Sade – By Your Side (The Neptunes Remix) (Promo CDS) "By Your Side (The Neptunes Remix)"

Ludacris – Back for the First Time 14. "Southern Hospitality"

Lil' Kim – How Many Licks (CDS) "How Many Licks (Neptunes Remix)"

Sheã Seger – May Street Project 3. "Blind Situation" (featuring D.R.U.G.S.) (produced with Martin Terefe)

Jay-Z – The Dynasty: ROC La Familia 3. "I Just Wanna Love U (Give It To Me) (featuring Pharrell, Shay Haley & Omilio Sparks)

Backstreet Boys –  Black & Blue 16. "The Call (Neptunes Remix)" (featuring Clipse)

 2001 
Various artists – Urban Renewal: The Songs Of Phil Collins 8. "I Don't Care Anymore" (performed by Kelis featuring Pharrell)
 14. "I Wish It Would Rain Down" (performed by Brian McKnight)

Backstreet Boys – The Call Remixes (CDS) 4. "The Call" (Neptunes Remix with Pharrell and Clipse)

Angie Martinez – Up Close & Personal 17. "Dem Thangz" (featuring Pharrell & Q-Tip)

Various artists –  Dr. Dolittle 2 OST 7. "What It Is Part II" (Flipmode Squad featuring Busta Rhymes and Kelis)

Ray J – This Ain't a Game 2. "Wait A Minute" (featuring Pharrell & Lil' Kim)
 4. "Formal Invite" (featuring Pharrell)
 8. "Out Tha Ghetto" (featuring Shorty Mack)

P. Diddy – The Saga Continues... 7. "Diddy"

Tha Liks – X.O. Experience 13. "Best U Can" (featuring Pharrell)

Foxy Brown – Broken Silence 7. "Candy" (featuring Kelis) 
 14. "Gangsta Boogie"

NSYNC – Celebrity 4. "Girlfriend"

Various artists – Rush Hour 2 OST 13. Blow My Whistle (Hikaru Utada featuring Foxy Brown)

N*E*R*D – In Search Of... All tracks

Jadakiss – Kiss Tha Game Goodbye 4. "Knock Yourself Out" (featuring Pharrell)

Philly's Most Wanted – Get Down Or Lay Down 1. "Radikal"
 3. "Suckas"
 4. "Pretty Tony"
 5. "Please Don't Mind"
 6. "Philly Celebrities"
 7. "Ladies Choice"
 9. "Cross the Border"
 10. "Dream Car" (featuring Pharrell)
 13. "Suckas, Pt. 2" (featuring Beanie Sigel)
 16. "Street Tax" (featuring Clipse)

Usher – 8701 3. "I Don't Know" (featuring Pharrell & P. Diddy)
 8. "U Don't Have To Call"

Krayzie Bone – Thug On Da Line 14. "I Don't Know What" (featuring Kelis)

Mary J. Blige – No More Drama 3. "Steal Away" (featuring Pharrell and Malice)

Musaliny-N-M.a.z.e. -  Thugmania (Rock With Us) 1. "Thugmania (Rock Wit Us)" (featuring Capone-N-Noreaga)

Babyface – Face2Face 2. "There She Goes"
 4. "Stressed Out" (featuring Pharrell)

Fabolous – Ghetto Fabolous 3. "Young'n (Holla Back)"

Various artists – Training Day OST 12. "Guns N' Roses" (performed by Clipse)

Garbage – Androgyny (CDS) (UK) 2. "Androgyny" (The Neptunes Remix)

T.I. – I'm Serious 7. "I'm Serious" (featuring Beenie Man) 
 9. "What's Yo Name" (featuring Pharrell)

Daft Punk – Harder, Better, Faster, Stronger (CDS) 3. "Harder, Better, Faster, Stronger" (The Neptunes Remix)

All Saints – Saints & Sinners 14. "Black Coffee (The Neptunes Remix)"
 
Kelis – Wanderland All tracks

Alana Davis – Fortune Cookies 6. "Bye Bye"

All Star Tribute – What's Going On: All-Star Tribute 8. "What's Going On (The Neptunes This One's For You Mix)"

Jermaine Dupri – Instructions 14. "Let's Talk About It" (featuring Clipse and Pharrell)

Britney Spears – Britney 1. "I'm A Slave 4 U"
 5. "Boys"
 Am I A Sinner (outtake)
 My Big Secret (outtake)
 Baby Can't You See (outtake) 

Faith Evans – Faithfully 4. "Burnin' Up"

Busta Rhymes – Genesis 3. "As I Come Back"
 16. "What It Is" (featuring Kelis)

Limp Bizkit – New Old Songs 1. "Nookie - For the Nookie" (Remixed by the Neptunes)
 6. "N 2 Gether Now - All in Together Now" (Remixed by the Neptunes)

Ice Cube – The Greatest Hits 17. "In the Late Night Hour" (featuring Clipse)

Joe – Better Days 5. "Isn't This the World"

Lil' Bow Wow – Doggy Bag 3. "Take Ya Home"

Mystikal – Tarantula 1. "Bouncin' Back (Bouncin' Me Against the Wall)" (featuring Pharrell) 
 12. "Go 'Head" (featuring Pharrell)

Latrelle – Dirty Girl, Wrong Girl, Bad Girl 1. "Infatuated"
 2. "I Need U"
 3. "My Life featuring Kelis"
 4. "Dirty Girl featuring Lisa “Left Eye” Lopes"
 5. "Long Night"
 6. "House Party"
 7. "Wrong Girl"
 8. "Nothing Else"
 9. "I Want U featuring Pusha T"

 2002 
Air – Everybody Hertz 4. "Don't Be Light" (Neptunes Remix)

Busta Rhymes - Pass the Courvoisier Part II (VLS) "Pass the Courvoisier Part II" (featuring Pharrell & P. Diddy)

Destiny's Child – This Is the Remix 2. "Emotion" (The Neptunes Remix)

Nelly – Nellyville 3. "Hot In Herre"

N.O.R.E. – God's Favorite 3. "Nothin'" (featuring Pharrell)
 4. "Grimey"
 8. "Full Mode"
 10. "Head Bussa"
 15. "Consider This" (featuring Kelis)

Various Artists – Austin Powers In Goldmember OST 1. "Work It Out" (performed by Beyonce)

Scarface – The Fix 9. "Someday" (featuring Faith Evans)

Beenie Man – Tropical Storm 2. "Feel It Boy" (featuring Janet Jackson)
 3. "Bad Girl" (featuring Justin Vince)
 10. "Bossman" (featuring Lady Saw and Sean Paul)

Clipse – Lord Willin' All tracks

Nivea – Nivea 7. "Run Away (I Wanna Be With U)" (featuring Pusha T)

TLC – 3D 5. "In Your Arms Tonight"

LL Cool J – 10 3. "Luv U Better" (featuring Marc Dorsey) 
 6. "Niggy Nuts"
 7. "Amazin'" (featuring Kandice Love)
 8. "Clockin' G's"
 12. "U Should"

Alicia Keys – Remixed & Unplugged In A Minor 7. "How Come You Don't Call Me" (Neptunes Remix)

Justin Timberlake – Justified 1. "Señorita"
 2. Like I Love You (featuring Clipse)
 4. "Take It from Here"
 6. "Rock Your Body"
 7. "Nothin' Else"
 8. "Last Night" 
 12. "Let's Take A Ride"

Ms. Jade – Girl Interrupted 4. "The Come Up"

Jay-Z – The Blueprint 2: The Gift & the Curse 5. "Excuse Me Miss"
 9. "Fuck All Nite" 
 19. "Nigga Please" (featuring Young Chris)
 22. "A Ballad for the Fallen Soldier" (featuring DJ Clue?)

Sean Paul – Dutty Rock 18. "Bubble" (featuring Fahrenheit)

Toni Braxton – More Than A Woman 4. "Hit the Freeway" (featuring Loon)

Ja Rule – The Last Temptation 4. "Pop Niggas"

Birdman – Birdman 10. "What Happened To That Boy" (featuring Clipse)

Busta Rhymes – It Ain't Safe No More... 4. "Call the Ambulance" (featuring Rampage)

Royce da 5'9" – Rock City 3. "Off Parole" (featuring Tre Little)
 6. "Mr. Baller" (featuring Clipse, Pharrell and Tre Little)

Snoop Dogg – Paid tha Cost to Be da Bo$$ 4. "From Tha Chuuuch To Da Palace" (featuring Pharrell)
 8. "Beautiful" (featuring Pharrell & Charlie Wilson)

Common – Electric Circus 6. "Come Close" (featuring Mary J. Blige) 
 9. "I Got A Right Tha" (featuring Pharrell)

Solange – Solo Star 5. "Crush"

 2003 
Various artists – Biker Boyz OST 4. "Don't Look Back" (performed by Papa Roach and N*E*R*D)

702 – Star 6. "I Still Love You" (featuring Pharrell) 
 2. "Star" (featuring Clipse)

Kardinal Offishall – Belly Dancer (CDS) Belly Dancer (featuring Pharrell)

Various artists – Charlie's Angels 2 – Full Throttle OST 10. "Nas' Angels...The Flyest" (performed by Nas featuring Pharrell)

Various artists - Bad Boys 2 OST 2. "Show Me Your Soul" (performed by P. Diddy, Lenny Kravitz, Pharrell and Loon) (produced with Lenny Kravitz and Sean "Puffy" Combs)
 3. "La-La-La" (performed by Jay-Z)

Bow Wow – Unleashed 6. "The Don, the Dutch"
 7. "The Movement"
 11. "I'll Move On" (featuring Mario)

The Neptunes - Clones All tracks

Ludacris - Chicken-n-Beer 10. "P-Poppin" (featuring Shawnna and Lil Fate) (produced with Zukhan Bey)

Jay-Z – The Black Album 5. "Change Clothes" 
 13. "Allure"

Kelis – Tasty 3. "Milkshake"
 6. "Flashback"
 7. "Protect My Heart"
 10. "Sugar Honey Iced Tea"
 12. "Rolling Through the Hood"

Rosco P. Coldchain – Delinquent (CDS)  "Delinquent" feat. Pharrell

 2004 
Re-Up Gang – We Got It 4 Cheap Vol. 1 13. "Stuntin' Y'all" (featuring Pharrell)

Various artists – Barbershop 2: Back In Business OST "Pussy" (performed by Clipse)

Cee Lo Green – Cee-Lo Green... Is the Soul Machine 3. "The Art Of Noise" (featuring Pharrell)
 16. "Let's Stay Together" (featuring Pharrell)

N*E*R*D – Fly Or Die All tracks

Jadakiss – Kiss Of Death 9. "Hot Sauce To Go" (featuring Pharrell)

Talib Kweli– The Beautiful Struggle 3. "Broken Glass"

Fabolous – Real Talk 5. "Tit 4 Tat" (featuring Pharrell)
 14. "Young & Sexy" (featuring Pharrell and Mike Shorey)

Gwen Stefani – Love.Angel.Music.Baby. 3. "Hollaback Girl"

Lil Jon & the East Side Boyz – Crunk Juice 19. "Stick Dat Thang Out (Skeezer)" (featuring Pharrell and Ying Yang Twins)

Snoop Dogg – R&G (Rhythm & Gangsta): The Masterpiece 3. Drop It Like It's Hot (featuring Pharrell) 
 8. Let's Get Blown (featuring Pharrell) 
 10. "Perfect" (featuring Charlie Wilson)
 16. "Signs" (featuring Justin Timberlake & Charlie Wilson)
 18. "Pass It Pass It"

T.I. – Urban Legend 11. "Freak Though" (featuring Pharrell)

Usher - Yeah! CD Single
 3. "Sweet Lies" featuring Vanessa Marquez

 2005 
Omarion – O 2. "Touch"

Beanie Sigel – The B. Coming 5. "Don't Stop" (featuring Snoop Dogg)

Faith Evans – The First Lady 1. "Goin' Out" (featuring Pharrell & Pusha T)

Mariah Carey – The Emancipation of Mimi 5. "Say Somethin' (featuring Snoop Dogg)
 12. "To the Floor" (featuring Nelly)

Missy Elliott – The Cookbook 7. "On & On"

Slim Thug – Already Platinum 2. "Like A Boss"
 6. "I Ain't Heard Of That (Remix)" (featuring Bun B)
 7. "Click Clack" (featuring Pusha T)
 9. "Already Platinum" (featuring Pharrell)
 10. "Ashy To Classy"
 12. "Playa Ya Don't Know"
 15. "This Is My Life" (featuring LeToya Luckett)
 16. "Dedicate"

Nelly – Sweat 3. Flap Your Wings"

Nelly – Suit 1. "Play It Off" (featuring Pharrell)

Twista – The Day After 5. "Lavish" (featuring Pharrell)
 10. "When I Get You Home (A.I.O.U.)" (featuring Jamie Foxx and Pharrell)

Q-Tip – For the Nasty (CDS) "For the Nasty" (featuring Pharrell and Busta Rhymes)

Teriyaki Boyz – Beef Or Chicken 6. "超 L A R G E" (featuring Pharrell)

 2006 
T.I. – King 15. "Goodlife" (featuring Pharrell and Common)

LL Cool J – Todd Smith 5. "Best Dress" (featuring Jamie Foxx)

Various artists – Fast & Furious 3 – Tokyo Drift OST 1. "Tokyo Drift" (performed by Teriyaki Boyz)

Beyoncé – B'Day 6. "Kitty Kat" (produced with Beyonce)
 8. "Green Light" (produced with Beyonce and Sean Garrett)

Lupe Fiasco – Food & Liquor 5. "I Gotcha"

Ludacris – Release Therapy 3. "Money Maker" (featuring Pharrell) 
 4. "Girls Gone Wild"

Robin Thicke – The Evolution of Robin Thicke 10. "Wanna Love You Girl" (featuring Pharrell)

Sleepy Brown – Mr. Brown 2. "Margarita" (featuring Pharrell & Big Boi)

Diddy – Press Play 19. "Partners For Life" (featuring Jamie Foxx)

Jay-Z – Kingdom Come 9. "Anything" (featuring Pharrell and Usher)

Snoop Dogg – Tha Blue Carpet Treatment 4. "Vato" (featuring B-Real) 
 11. "10 Lil' Crips"

Clipse – Hell Hath No Fury 
 All tracks

Gwen Stefani – The Sweet Escape 1. "Wind It Up" (produced with Spike Stent and Ron Fair)
 3. "Orange County Girl"
 7. "Yummy" (featuring Pharrell)
 11. "U Started It" (produced with Spike Stent)

Ciara – The Evolution 5. "I Proceed"
 17. "I'm Just Me" (featuring Pharrell)

Fefe Dobson – Sunday Love 2. "In the Kissah" (produced with Fefe Dobson)

Omarion – 21 6. "Obsession"

Mos Def – True Magic 11. "Murder Of A Teenage Life"

 2007 
Yung Joc – Hustlenomics 5. "Hell Yeah" (featuring Diddy)
 9. "BYOB"

Twista – Adrenaline Rush 2007 14. "Give It Up (featuring Pharrell)

Tito El Bambino – It's My Time 7."Booty" (featuring Pharrell)

Britney Spears – Blackout 12. "Why Should I Be Sad"
 Sugarfall (outtake)
 Love In The Bahamas (outtake) 

Jay-Z – American Gangster 8. "I Know" (featuring Pharrell) 
 14. "Blue Magic" (featuring Pharrell)

Mario – Go! 1. "Go"

Mary J. Blige – Growing Pains 8. "Till the Morning"

 2008 
Snoop Dogg – Ego Trippin' 10. "Sets Up" (featuring Pharrell)

Madonna – Hard Candy(Tracks produced with Madonna)
 1. "Candy Shop" 
 3. "Give It 2 Me" 
 4. "Heartbeat" 
 6. "She's Not Me" 
 7. "Incredible" 
 8. "Beat Goes On" (featuring Kanye West)
 10. "Spanish Lesson"My Drive Thru (Converse Anniversary) (Promo CDS) "My Drive Thru" (featuring Pharrell, Santogold and Julian Casablancas)

N*E*R*D – Seeing Sounds All tracks

Solange – Sol-Angel and the Hadley St. Dreams 6. "I Decided"

Nelly – Brass Knuckles 10. "Let It Go (Lil' Mama)" (featuring Pharrell)

Chester French – She Loves Everybody EP 2. "She Loves Everybody (The Neptunes Remix)"

Common – Universal Mind Control 1. "Intro/Universal Mind Control" (featuring Pharrell) 
 2. "Punch Drunk Love (The Eye)" (featuring Kanye West)
 4. "Sex For Suga"
 5. "Announcement" (featuring Pharrell)
 6. "Gladiator" (featuring Pharrell)
 8. "Inhale"
 9. "What A World" (featuring Chester French)

 2009 
Teriyaki Boyz – Serious Japanese 2. Work That!" (featuring Pharrell & Chris Brown) 
 9. "Zock On!" (featuring Pharrell and Busta Rhymes)
 14. "Tokyo Drift (Remix)" (featuring Pusha T & Fam-Lay)

Various artists – Fast & Furious 4 OST 2. "G-Stro" (performed by Busta Rhymes)
 4. "Blanco" (performed by Pitbull and Pharrell)
 6. "You Slip, She Grip" (performed by Tego Calderón and Pitbull)
 7. "Head Bust" (performed by Shark City Click and Pharrell)
 8. "Bad Girls" (performed by Pitbull and Robin Thicke)

Jadakiss – The Last Kiss 7. "Stress Ya" (featuring Pharrell)
 11. "Rockin' With the Best" (featuring Pharrell & Bobby V)

Mos Def – The Ecstatic 2. "Twilite Speedball" (produced with Mos Def)

Queen Latifah – Persona 12. "If He Wanna" (featuring Serani)

Jay-Z – The Blueprint 3 14. "So Ambitious" (featuring Pharrell)

Shakira – She Wolf(Tracks produced with Shakira)
 2. "Did It Again"
 3. "Long Time" 
 4. "Why Wait" 
 5. "Good Stuff" 
 10. "Lo Hecho Está Hecho"
 11. "Años Luz "
Jennifer Lopez (aka Lola) – Fresh Out the Oven (CDM) "Fresh Out the Oven" (featuring Pharrell & Pitbull)

Various artists – 90210 OST 2. "Soldier" (performed by N*E*R*D and Santigold)

Michael Jackson – The Remix Suite 2. "Never Can Say Goodbye (Neptunes Remix)"

Wale – Attention Deficit 6. "Let It Loose" (featuring Pharrell)

Clipse – Til the Casket Drops 2. "Popular Demand (Popeyes)" (featuring Cam'ron & Pharrell)
 4. "Showing Out" (featuring Yo Gotti & Pharrell)
 5. "I'm Good" (featuring Pharrell)
 7. "Door Man"
 9. "All Eyes On Me" (featuring Keri Hilson)
 10. "Counseling" (featuring Nicole Hurst & Pharrell)
 11. "Champion" (featuring Graph Nobel)
 13. "Life Change" (featuring Kenna)

Snoop Dogg – Malice in Wonderland 13. "Special" (featuring Brandy and Pharrell)

 2010 
Ludacris – Battle of the Sexes 15. "Sexting"

N*E*R*D – Nothing All tracks
 2. "Hypnotize U" (produced with Daft Punk)

T.I. – No Mercy 3. "Get Back Up" (featuring Chris Brown) 
 10. "Amazing" (featuring Pharrell)

Cee-Lo Green – It's OK 4. "Bridges"

Gucci Mane
"The Appeal: Georgia's Most Wanted"
9. "Haterade" (featuring Nicki Minaj and Pharrell Williams

 2011 
Lupe Fiasco – Lasers 13. "I'm Beamin"

Travis Barker – Give the Drummer Some 2. "If You Want To" (featuring Pharrell and Lupe Fiasco)

Big Sean – Finally Famous	
 8. "Get It (DT)"

The Cool Kids – When Fish Ride Bicycles 8. "Get Right"
 11. "Summer Jam" (featuring Maxine Ashley)

JAY-Z & Kanye West – Watch the Throne 5. "Gotta Have It" (produced with Kanye West)

Pusha T – Fear of God II: Let Us Pray 3. "Trouble On My Mind" (featuring Tyler, the Creator) (produced with Left Brain)
 9. "Raid" (featuring 50 Cent and Pharrell)

 2012 
Jay-Z – Glory (Promo CDS) "Glory" (featuring B.I.C.)

Rye Rye – Go! Pop! Bang! 11. "Shake, Twist, Drop" (featuring Tyga)

Curren$y – The Stoned Immaculate 9. "Chasin' Paper" (featuring Pharrell)

Game - California Republic 15. "When My Niggas Come Home" (featuring Snoop Dogg and Pharrell)
 16. "It Must Be Tough" (featuring Pharrell and Mysonne)
 22. "They Don't Want None" (featuring Shyne and Pharrell)
 24. "Roll My Shit" (featuring Snoop Dogg)

D.O.P.E. - D.O.P.E. 
 2. "Block Blazer" (feat. T.I.)

 2013 
Earl Sweatshirt – Doris 2. "Burgundy" (featuring Vince Staples)

Pusha T - Wrath Of Caine 6. Revolution

 2015 
N*E*R*D – The SpongeBob Movie 2: Sponge Out Of Water OST 1. "Squeeze Me"
 2. "Sandy Squirrel"
 3. "Patrick Star"

Snoop Dogg –  Bush 1. "California Roll" (featuring Stevie Wonder)
 2. "This City"
 3. "R U A Freak"
 4. "Awake"
 5. "So Many Pros"
 7. "Edibles" (featuring T.I.)

 2016 
Little Big Town - Wanderlust 7. "Miracle"

 2017 
N*E*R*D - No One Ever Really Dies 6. "ESP"

 2018 
Justin Timberlake - Man of the Woods(Tracks produced with Justin Timberlake)
 2. "Midnight Summer Jam" 
 4. "Man of the Woods" 
 5. "Higher, Higher"
 6. "Wave" 
 7. "Supplies" 
 11. "Flannel" 
 12. "Montana" 
 13. "Breeze Off the Pond" 
 14. "Living Off the Land" 

2019
Daniel Caesar - Case Study 01 4. "Frontal Lobe Muzik"

Pharrell Williams – Music from The Black Godfather 1. "Letter To My Godfather"

 2020 
Megan Thee Stallion - Suga
 7. "Stop Playing" (featuring Gunna)
 8. "Crying in the Car"

Buju Banton -  Upside Down 2020 9. "Cherry Pie"

Monica - Trenches 1. "Trenches" (featuring Lil Baby)

SZA - Hit Different 1. "Hit Different" (featuring Ty Dolla Sign)

deadmau5 and the Neptunes - Pomegranate 1. "Pomegranate"

Pharrell Williams - Entrepreneur 1. "Entrepreneur" (featuring Jay-Z)

 2021 
Summer Walker - Still Over It 14. "Dat Right There"
Cassie - Hide 01 "Hide" (featuring Pharrell Williams)

Moneybagg Yo - A Gangsta's Pain 15. "Projects" 
 18. "Certified Neptunes" (featuring Pharrell Williams)

Snoh Aalegra - Temporary Highs in the Violet Skies 03. "In Your Eyes"

IDK - USEE4YOURSELF 12. Keto (featuring Swae Lee and Rico Nasty)

 Pop Smoke - Faith 
 07. "Top Shotta" (featuring BEAM, Pusha T, TRAVI)
 17. "Spoiled" (featuring Pharrell Williams)
 20. "Merci Beaucoup"

 Metallica - The Metallica BlacklistDisc 3
 03. "Wherever I May Roam" (Remix)

 A$AP Ferg - Green Juice 01. "Green Juice"

 Orelsan - Civilisation 
 12. "Dernier verre"

 2022 
Rosalía – Motomami 06. "Hentai"
 09. "Motomami"

Nigo - I Know Nigo! 01. "Lost & Found Freestyle 2019" (performed by A$AP Rocky, Tyler, The Creator and Nigo)
 03. "Punch Bowl" (Performed by Clipse and Nigo)

Omar Apollo - Ivory 12. "Tamagotchi"

Brent Faiyaz - Wasteland''
 09. "Wasting Time" (featuring Drake)

References

Discographies of American artists
Production discographies
Discography
Hip hop discographies